Short track speed skating at the 2011 Canada Winter Games was held at the St. Margaret's Centre in Upper Tantallon, Nova Scotia.

The events will be held during the first week between February 13 and 17, 2011.

The seating capacity for these games will be 1,000 spectators.

Men

Women

References

2011 in short track speed skating
2011 Canada Winter Games
Canada Winter Games